A Thief's Daughter is a 2019 Spanish drama film directed by Belén Funes, starring Greta and Eduard Fernández. 

The film was nominated for two Goya Awards with Funes winning award for Best New Director.

Cast
 Greta Fernández as Sara
 Eduard Fernández as Manuel
 Àlex Monner as Dani
 Tomás Martín as Martín
 Adela Silvestre as Noe
 Borja Espinosa as Borja 
 Frank Feys as Marcel

Reception
A Thief's Daughter received positive reviews from film critics.

Accolades

|-
| rowspan = "16" align = "center" | 2020
| rowspan=1 | 7th Feroz Awards
| Best Actress
| Greta Fernández
| 
| align = "center" | 
|-
| rowspan = "13" | 12th Gaudí Awards || colspan = "2" | Best Non-Catalan Language Film ||  || rowspan = "13" | 
|-
| Best Director || Belén Funes || 
|-
| Best Screenplay || Belén Funes, Marçal Cebrián || 
|-
| Best Actress || Greta Fernández || 
|-
| Best Actor || Eduard Fernández || 
|-
| Best Production Supervision || Marta Ramírez || 
|-
| Best Art Direction || Marta Bazaco || 
|-
| Best Editing || Bernat Aragonés || 
|-
| Best Supporting Actor || Àlex Monner || 
|-
| Best Cinematography || Neus Ollé || 
|-
| Best Costume Design || Desirée Guirao || 
|-
| Best Sound || Sergio Rueda, Enrique G. Bermejo, Carlos Jiménez || 
|-
| Best Makeup and Hairstyles || Elisa Alonso || 
|-
| rowspan=2 | 34th Goya Awards
| Best Actress
| Greta Fernández
| 
| rowspan = "2" | 
|-
| Best New Director
| Belén Funes
| 
|}

See also 
 List of Spanish films of 2019

References

External links
 
 

2019 films
Spanish drama films
2010s Spanish-language films
2019 drama films
2010s Spanish films